Benji is a village near the small town Silli (Agastyamuni) of Rudraprayag District, Uttarakhand State in India. It is pronounced as Byenji in local Garhwali language. It is known for being the site of the first victim of the Leopard of Rudraprayag. A primary school located in place name hedi under the village.

Villages in Rudraprayag district